Chavara Public School Pala  is a school in Pala, Kottayam, Kerala, India, providing elementary and secondary education. The School  was founded in the year 1998 by Carmelites of Mary Immaculate (CMI). It follows the rigorous CBSE (Central Board of Secondary Education) syllabus.

The school has the motto "Aspire and Achieve" as the vision statement. The aim of the School is to groom students to be an academically excellent, culturally talented, socially acceptable human beings and an efficient enterprising global leaders.   

The  Congregation of the Carmelites of Mary Immaculate is the first indigenous religious order of Catholic priests and brothers, founded in Kerala in 1831, by Saint Kuriakose Elias Chavara and his associates. The congregation took up education as a service to the nation in general and to the Catholic community in particular from the time of its founding father.

Fr Sabu Koodappatt CMI is the current principal of the School.

References 

Carmelite educational institutions
Catholic schools in India
Christian schools in Kerala
Schools in Kottayam district
Education in Pala, Kerala
Educational institutions established in 1998
1998 establishments in Kerala